Diacylglycerol oil (DAG oil) is a cooking oil in which the ratio of triglycerides, also known as Triacylglycerols (TAGs), to diacylglycerols (DAGs) is shifted to contain mostly DAG, unlike conventional cooking oils, which are rich in TAGs. Vegetable DAG oil, for example, contains 80% DAG and is used as a 1:1 replacement for liquid vegetable oils in all applications.

How it works 

DAGs and TAGs are natural components in all vegetable oils. Through an enzymatic process, the DAG content of a combination of soy and canola oils is significantly increased. Unlike TAG, which is stored as body fat, DAG is immediately burned as energy. With DAG-rich oil containing more than 80% DAG, less of the oil is stored as body fat than with traditional oils, which are rich in TAG.  Excess calories consumed by the body are converted into fat and stored, regardless if it is consumed as DAG or TAG.

Study 
According to a 2007 Study 
Diacylglycerol (DAG) oil is Present with vegetable oil, However, a Recent study (2007 edition) showed (indicates) that the DAG oil is effective for both fasting and postprandial hyperlipidemia and according also to same study it helps also to prevent excess adiposity

FDA designation 

DAG oil was designated as generally recognized as safe (GRAS) by an outside panel of scientific experts, and their conclusion has been reviewed and accepted by the US Food and Drug Administration (FDA). This GRAS determination is for use in vegetable oil spreads and home cooking oil. In Japan, the Ministry of Health, Labor and Welfare has approved DAG oil to manage serum triglycerides after a meal, which leads to less build-up of body fat.

Side effects 

Because DAG oil is digested the same way as conventional vegetable oils, the potential side effects are no different than those of conventional oil. In addition, studies with animals and human subjects have shown no adverse effects from single-dose or long-term consumption of DAG-rich oil. It has also been found that fat-soluble vitamins' status is not affected by the consumption of DAG-rich oil.

Research 

Studies indicate that DAG oil has numerous health benefits, including reducing post-meal blood triglyceride levels. Clinical studies in Japan have also shown that DAG oil may increase overall metabolism, helping reduce the amount of fat already stored in the body.

Sales suspended voluntarily 
On September 16, 2009, Kao Corporation, maker of Econa Cooking Oil has voluntarily suspended sales of products containing DAG oil in Japan, which include cooking oil, mayonnaise, salad dressing, and pet food products. The company is cited as considering suspending the sales of Enova Brand Oil sold in North America. On the same day, Hagoromo Foods, maker of Sea Chicken brand of canned tuna, and Satonoyuki, maker of tofu products, have voluntarily suspended number of products made with Econa Cooking Oil sold in Japan.

In its press release announcing the temporally suspension of Econa line of products, Kao cites questions raised by European researchers on the uncertain health effect of glycidyl fatty acid esters (GE). It states that GE contained in the products are introduced as by-product of deodorization process, but maintains that the main ingredient DAG (Diacylglycerol) is proven safe, and says it plans to resume sale after reducing the amount of GE introduced in its production method.

References 

Cooking oils